Joe Davies (1926 – 1973) was an English footballer who played as a winger in the Football League for Chester.

References

1926 births
1973 deaths
Association football wingers
Chester City F.C. players
English Football League players
English footballers
Sportspeople from Birkenhead